Sociedade Esportiva River Plate, commonly known as River Plate, was a Brazilian football club based in Carmópolis, Sergipe state. They competed in the Série D twice.

History
The club was founded on August 18, 1967. River Plate won the Campeonato Sergipano Second Level in 2009, and the First Level in 2010. The club competed in the 2010 Série D, when they were eliminated in the First Stage of the competition. They won the Campeonato Sergipano First Level again in 2011, after beating São Domingos in the final, and competed in the Série D in the same year, when they were eliminated in the First Stage.

Achievements
Campeonato Sergipano:
 Winners (2): 2010, 2011
Campeonato Sergipano Second Level:
 Winners (2): 1991, 2009

Current squad

References

Football clubs in Sergipe
Association football clubs established in 1967
1967 establishments in Brazil